Bigfoot Presents: Meteor and the Mighty Monster Trucks is an animated television series created by David Snyder and Bill Gross, and produced by Toronto based animation studio, Big Bang Digital Studios, Endgame Entertainment, and CCI Entertainment, which aired from September 23, 2006, to October 11, 2008, on Discovery Kids. It presented the fictional adventures of anthropomorphic monster trucks with the personalities of younger children.

In 2007, Bigfoot Presents: Meteor and the Mighty Monster Trucks was nominated for an Emmy Award in the Outstanding Special Class Animated Programs category. Head writers credited on the show were Ken Cuperus, Alice Prodanou and Dave Dias. Voices were recorded in Toronto, Ontario, Canada.

Plot
Episodes take place in the fictional town of Crushington Park, especially in a practice arena full of obstacles and cars to destroy. The reference to Bigfoot (the original monster truck) appears to be a late addition to the program. The pilot episode "Race Relations" does not have the character LT (Bigfoot's son), but instead has a tow truck named Hook who also has a profile on the official website. The official website also includes a video from a pre-Bigfoot version of the pilot episode with a different theme song.

Characters

Main 
 Meteor T. Rover (voiced by Cameron Ansell) is a space expeditionary rover-modeled monster truck sporting red tires and the main character of the series.
 José (voiced by Mitchell Eisner) is a fire engine-modeled monster truck and the cousin of LT. Has pickaxe and fire helmet patterns on his tires.
 Junkboy (voiced by Cliff Saunders) is a garbage truck-modeled monster truck. Has trash can patterns on his tires.
 Ponytail (voiced by Tajja Isen) is a pink monster truck sporting a blonde ponytail and horseshoe patterns on her tires.
 Little Tow (LT) (voiced by Scott McCord) is a tow truck-modeled monster truck who is the son of Bigfoot and the cousin of José. He has tow hook patterns on his tires.
 Sarge (voiced by Dan Petronijevic) is a military jeep-modeled monster truck. He typically refers to his friends as "soldiers", hence his military-like personality.
 Sinker (voiced by Linda Ballantyne) is a blueish-green monster truck decked out in fishing gear and wears a red and yellow checkered hat. He has fish patterns on his tires.
 Amby (voiced by Laurie Elliot) is an ambulance-modeled monster truck. Has band-aid patterns on his tires.
 Big Wheelie (voiced by Brad Adamson and Martin Roach) is a school bus-modeled monster truck and the teacher/headmaster of Crushington Park School.
 The Race Announcer (voiced by Brad Adamson) is an unseen announcer who commentates the races the trucks are in.

Supporting
 Bigfoot (voiced by Rod Wilson) is the most famous monster truck. He is LT and Zooey's dad, and José's uncle. Bigfoot is always seen at the Crushington Park Speedway practicing with the other famous monster trucks. He is based on, and named after the truck of the same name.
 Boo Boo (voiced by George Buza) is the owner of Boo Boo's Body Shop and is the only mechanic in town.
 Buck Haymaker (voiced by Keith Hampshire) is a tractor-styled monster truck. He is Pony's father and Duke's uncle.
 Cement Brent is a cement truck-styled monster truck. He is the Father of Concrete Pete.
 Concrete Pete is a young cement truck-styled monster truck. He has V patterns on his tires.
 Cosmo Starfinder (voiced by Len Carlson) is a famous monster truck who is one of Meteor's heroes.
 Crushmeister (voiced by Cathal J. Dodd) is a famous monster truck. He is friends with Big Wheelie.
 Duke (voiced by Lyon Smith) is Pony's cousin. He has cow horn patterns on his tires.
 Dynamic Dan (voiced by Brian Froud) is the host of the TV show "Monster Trucking Today." Dynamic Dan has film patterns on his tires.
 Forby Forklift is a forklift styled monster truck sporting golden brown tires.
 Grandpa Rover (voiced by Bill Lynn) is Meteor's grandfather.
 Hook (voiced by Joanne Vannicola) is an orange monster truck who has broken lightbulb and cross-bone patterns on his tires.
 King Crush is an oversized steamroller-like monster truck from the horror movies.
 Mrs. Halftrack (voiced by Valerie Boyle) is a monster truck that once served in the military. She served as substitute teacher while Big Wheelie was competing in a mountain monster truck race in "Where's Wheelie".
 Mrs. Rover (voiced by Julie Lemieux) is Meteor's mom who is currently on a space mission.
 Senora Rosa (voiced by Rosa Labordé) is LT and Zooey's mom. Has rose patterns on her tires.
 Sue the Rooter is a sewage truck-styled monster truck. She has plunger patterns on her tires.
 Zooey (voiced by Isabel de Carteret) is LT's younger sister who sports two pigtails. She knows everything about animals. Has paw-print patterns on her tires.
 Girl Truck (voiced by Alessandra Cannito in "King Krush" and Tajja Isen in "Special Delivery") is a yellow truck resembling Amby.
 Boy Truck (voiced by Timothy Lai in "King Krush" and Cole Caplan in "Special Delivery") is a blue truck resembling Ponytail.

Episodes
 "Race Relations" – Meteor is new to Crushing Park School and is nervous about being in his new school. This is the series premiere. (Airdate: September 25, 2006)
 "Missing for Mom" – Meteor's mom goes away to outer space and he feels very homesick without her. But can Meteor help his Monster Trucks save her, or will she be stuck in outer space forever? (Airdate: September 26, 2006)
 "Bathtime for Junkboy" – Junkboy doesn't want to go to the car wash because he says he isn't a clean monster truck. But then he learns that if a vehicle is not clean, the engine won't work properly. (Airdate: September 27, 2006) 
 "The Big Time Out" – Meteor and José receive a time out when they crash into Big Wheelie's special starting light. While the boys think they're being reprimanded for damaging the light, they learn that teammates need to race with each other, not against each other.
 "The Big Sleepover" – Sinker cannot go to Little Tow's sleepover because he wants to rest up for a rally with his family. But everyone else doesn't listen to Big Wheelie's orders, telling everyone to rest up before the rally. The following day after the sleepover, everyone gets tired. The trucks learn that resting up before a race is very important.
 "Team Work" – The trucks learn that teamwork is very important, and teams must do things together, not by themselves. José learns that he must listen to his teammates before doing anything else.
 "The King Krush" – After watching a scary movie, the trucks believe that there is such a thing as King Krush. They get scared of the noises at night, but it turns out its just Big Wheelie.
 "The Pennant Race" – Meteor gets a new special pennant. Everyone wants the pennant, but Meteor doesn't want to share it. However, during a race, he loses his pennant. It's up to the trucks to help find his pennant.
 "The Truck Who Cried Tow" – Meteor tries to call Little Tow to help him, but he pulls himself out. Little Tow tricks the others into thinking he is stuck.  Ironically, during a race, Little Tow has to be pulled out of the mud.
 "Hang Time" – The trucks want to go to the Junkyard, but Big Wheelie says no because it is a dangerous place to go. However, the trucks do not listen, and they cause a ton of havoc. They all learn that rules are there for a reason.
 "Over-Heated" – Amby gets overheated after completing a race.
 "Your Name Is Mud" – Meteor is stuck in wet mud and Junkboy thinks it's all his fault.  
 "Here Comes the Crushmeister" – The Crushmeister, the biggest and best monster truck, comes to Crushington Park. Meteor finds out that he and Big Wheelie are good friends.
 "Meteor in Charge" – Meteor is chosen to be the big leader of the project assigned by Big Wheelie. He feels nervous about this at first but uses his leadership skills to battle his nervousness.
 "Try, Try Again" – Meteor learns that he must practice in order for things to be perfect.
 "Grandpa Was a Moonrover" – Meteor's grandpa, the first ever monster truck to go on the moon, comes to visit the other trucks.
 "Meteor's Nightmare" – Meteor has a nightmare about the sky changing and the Little Tow teasing him. Meteor thinks the nightmare is real. He learns that nightmares cannot hurt you in any way, shape, or form. 
 "The Backwards Race" – The trucks have a backwards race. Big Wheelie encourages everyone to practice and how important it is. Meteor also learns that he should never give up on himself.
 "A Big Hook for Little Tow" – Little Tow finds a big hook in the dumpster, which was his grandfather's old hook. But he learns that a little truck can't have a big hook.
 "Top Secret" – It's Meteor's birthday. He tries to tell everyone that it's his birthday, but he always gets cut off and bashed around by the other trucks as they're up to something.
 "A-Maze-ing Race" – José does not follow instructions given by Big Wheelie. The trucks go through a maze and learn the importance of following directions the first time they are given.
 "Sue the Rooter Truck" – The trucks meet Sue, a new classmate at Crushington Park School. However, the trucks see her as a mean angry monster truck at first. They eventually get along with each other.
 "Space Rangers" – Cosmo Starfinder, the greatest space vehicle ever, visits Crushington Park. (Posthumous release for Len Carlson)
 "On Shaky Ground" – Duke, Ponytail's older cousin, visits Crushington Park. However, Ponytail learns the importance of telling parents where they are and to check in so they won't be worried.
 "Monster Trucking Today" – Amby and José get into an accident while practicing for being on "Monster Truck Today". Ponytail goes on the show because she knows it's best to think about others, like her friends, rather than herself.
 "Where's Wheelie" – Ms. Halftrack, a military monster truck, substitutes for Big Wheelie while he is away at a rally.
 "Snag To The Flag" – Forby the Forklift is new to Crushington Park School. He is very shy at first. Meteor and the gang make Forby feel more welcome by encouraging him to join in a game of Snag the Flag.
 "Mending Fences" – Sarge crashes into the concrete fence and damages it. Cement Brent and Concrete Pete come over to fix the fence.
 "Pushing The Limits" – Meteor and his grandpa visit the Crushington Crasher Speedway, the same track where Bigfoot raced on.
 "Road Map" – Meteor, Junkboy, and Little Tow go on a scavenger hunt.
 "Sinker's Lucky Pump" – Sinker learns that trying something different is always good.
 "Special Delivery" – Meteor's mother is sending him a special rocket from Mars with a gift inside. The trucks think the gift is aliens, but really, it's a rock from an alien planet.
 "Charity Drive" – The trucks collect old hubcaps for the charity drive to help other trucks. However, José and Little Tow compete in collecting hubcaps, and learn that giving things to unfortunate trucks is the right thing to do rather than to compete.
 "Twin Engines" – Meteor and Little Tow babysit Precious and Cutie Pie, twin baby monster trucks.
 "April Fool's Day" – The other trucks honk at Meteor because Little Tow put a honk sign on the back of him as an April Fool's prank.
 "Monster Trucks Club" – The trucks form their own club in a clubhouse.
 "The Boomers" – Little Tow and Junkboy get flat tires, which they really never get.
 "A Monster Trucks Tale" – Meteor's grandpa tells a monster truck tale to the trucks during a sleepover.
 "Rebel Rovers" – Meteor is always chosen by Big Wheelie and the other trucks think he's the teacher's pet.
 "Cheering Section" – Meteor, Junkboy, and Little Tow with his family all attend a Monster Truck Crush-off. Junkboy learns that distracting others isn't exactly a good idea.
 "Fast Friends" – This is a flashback episode of when Little Tow and Meteor meet.
 "Tag Along" – Little Tow babysits Zooey. He realizes that babysitting is not an easy job.
 "Fender Bender!" – Little Tow crashes into a sign and José crashes into a rock. Little Tow thinks he's the one responsible for the damage but learns that mistakes and accidents do happen.
 "Stomp, Honk, Rock and Roll" – Little Tow has stage fright and learns to conquer it When from Zooey honking.
 "Monster Crush" – The trucks get annoyed over with Zooey helping the other trucks get to the Bigfoot celebrity crush-off.
 "Fright Busters" – Zooey gets scared of things, but Bigfoot teaches her that there is nothing to be afraid of.
 "Like Father, Like Son" – Zooey and Little Tow accidentally break a new automatic gate and the bolt flies out. While they figure out a way to repair it, Bigfoot teaches some of his tricks to Little Tow.
 "Moving Trucks" – Little Tow believes he is moving again, but it turns out that it's the trees in their garden that needs moving.
 "Eyes On The Prize" – Bigfoot asks Little Tow to take care of his trophy. But it goes missing and the trucks must find it. Little Tow learns that responsibility is very important.
 "Winner's Circle" – José believes he never lost a race. The trucks reminisce about the times they won their races.
 "Truck Trouble" – Amby, Junkboy, José, Little Tow and Meteor reminisce about the times they got into trouble together and the lessons they've learned from their experiences.
 "Trucktacular Truckcathalon" – Little Tow is partnered up with his mother at the annual Truckathon. He believes they will not win until Señora shows cool tricks to win. This is the series finale.
 "The Space Rangers" is dedicated in memory of Len Carlson.

Christian version
A Christian version of Meteor, called Monster Truck Adventures, was produced and aired on The Church Channel and TBN in 2012, In this version, the race announcer would expound more upon each episode by reviewing its events and linking it to a Bible verse. This version partially removes references of Discovery Kids by replacing its logo with the Rising Star logo.

It was also broadcast on the Australian Christian Channel in Australia.

References

External links
 

2000s American animated television series
2000s American children's television series
2006 American television series debuts
2008 American television series endings
2000s Canadian animated television series
2000s Canadian children's television series
2006 Canadian television series debuts
2008 Canadian television series endings
American children's animated adventure television series
American children's animated sports television series
American computer-animated television series
American preschool education television series
Canadian children's animated adventure television series
Canadian children's animated sports television series
Canadian computer-animated television series
Canadian preschool education television series
Animated preschool education television series
2000s preschool education television series
English-language television shows
Cartoonito original programming
TLC (TV network) original programming
Discovery Kids original programming
Television series by 9 Story Media Group
Television series by Corus Entertainment
Animated television series about auto racing